2007 World Masters Athletics Championships is the seventeenth in a series of World Masters Athletics Outdoor Championships
that took place in Riccione, Italy from 4 to 15 September 2007.

The main venue was Stadio Italo Nicoletti. Supplemental venues included Stadio Comunale Santamonica in Misano Adriatico and Stadio Comunale San Giovanni in San Giovanni in Marignano.

This Championships was organized by World Masters Athletics (WMA) in coordination with a Local Organising Committee (LOC): Lamberto Vacchi, Luca Verrascina and Francesco Arese.

The WMA is the global governing body of the sport of athletics for athletes 35 years of age or older, setting rules for masters athletics competition.

In addition to a full range of track and field events,

non-stadia events included 8K Cross Country, 10K Race Walk (women), 20K Race Walk (men), and Marathon.

Results
Past Championships results are archived at WMA.

Additional archives are available from British Masters Athletic Federation

as a searchable pdf,

from European Masters Athletics

as a searchable pdf

and from Museum of Masters Track & Field

as a searchable pdf.

Masters world records set at this Championships are listed below.

Key:

Women

Men

References

External links

World Masters Athletics Championships
World Masters Athletics Championships
International athletics competitions hosted by Italy
2007
Masters athletics (track and field) records